Armando Bernando Vazquez Cotilla (August 20, 1923 - March 16, 2008) was a professional baseball player in the Negro leagues.

External links
 and Seamheads
Negro League Baseball Player's Association

Indianapolis Clowns players
New York Cubans players
1923 births
2008 deaths
Cuban expatriates in the United States
Baseball outfielders
Baseball infielders
People from Güines